Łukasz Kwiatkowski (29 May 1982 – 25 November 2018) was a Polish professional track cyclist. He represented his nation Poland in two Olympic Games (2004 and 2008), and also claimed numerous medals in track cycling at the UCI World Cup and European Championships since 2002. During his sporting career, Kwiatkowski raced for the ASK Stal Grudziądz pro cycling team before his official retirement in 2010.

Racing career
Kwiatkowski was born in Grudziądz. Considered one of Poland's strongest cyclists, he made headlines on the international scene as an 18-year-old teen, when he claimed the silver medal in the sprint final match against Australia's Ryan Bayley at the 2000 UCI Junior Track World Championships in Fiorenzuola, Italy.

An early success from junior cycling tournaments helped Kwiatkowski develop his form from a pure power sprinter into being one of the most successful Polish cyclists of all time. This showed that he had collected numerous medals in men's Keirin, sprint, and team sprint events at the European U-23 Championships and UCI World Cup.

Selected as the official member of the Polish cycling team, Kwiatkowski made his debut at the 2004 Summer Olympics in Athens, where he edged out Germany's top favorite Jens Fiedler to take the seventh spot in the men's keirin, but lost the repechage round one match to Barbados' Barry Forde in the men's sprint. Affiliating with Damian Zieliński and Rafał Furman in the men's team sprint, Kwiatkowski rode a split time of 13.360 on the second leg to deliver the Polish trio a ninth-place finish in 45.093, narrowly missing out in the first round match by eleven-hundredths of a second (0.11).

Shortly after his first Olympics, Kwiatkowski started the 2005–2006 season at the European Championships, where he helped the Polish squad score a more satisfactory triumph in the men's team sprint. He also added a silver medal to his seasonal career hardware in the final match against Ukraine's Andriy Vynokurov at the first stage of the UCI World Cup series in Moscow, Russia, making him the most successful male rider of the season by the Polish Cycling Federation.

Three years later, Kwiatkowski qualified for his second Polish squad, as a 25-year-old, in two track cycling events at the 2008 Summer Olympics in Beijing by receiving a berth from the UCI Track World Rankings. In the men's team sprint, held on the first day of the track program, Kwiatkowski and his teammates Maciej Bielecki and Kamil Kuczyński set a thirteenth-place time of 45.266 and an average speed of 59.647 km/h in an opening heat against Japan, but were relegated for swerving out of the lane on the final stretch, handing their rivals a more satisfactory triumph. Two days later, in the men's sprint, Kwiatkowski could not progress from the early stages after losing out again in the first round to Great Britain's Jason Kenny and the repechage to Malaysia's Azizulhasni Awang.

Kwiatkowski died at the age of 36 from leukemia.

Career highlights

2000
  UCI Junior Track World Championships (Sprint), Fiorenzuola (ITA)
2002
  European Championships (Sprint), Büttgen (GER)
  European Championships (Team sprint), Büttgen (GER)
  Stage 2, UCI World Cup (Sprint), Moscow (RUS)
  European Championships (Keirin), Büttgen (GER)
  Stage 1, UCI World Cup (Team sprint), Monterrey (MEX)
2003
  European Championships (Team sprint), Moscow (RUS)
  Stage 1, UCI World Cup (Team sprint), Moscow (RUS)
2004
  European Championships (Team sprint), Valencia (ESP)
  Stage 4, UCI World Cup (Team sprint), Sydney (AUS)
  European Championships (Sprint), Valencia (ESP)
 7th Olympic Games (Keirin), Athens (GRE)
 9th Olympic Games (Team sprint with Rafał Furman and Damian Zieliński), Athens (GRE)
2005
  European Championships (Team sprint with Kamil Kuczyński and Damian Zieliński), Fiorenzuola (ITA)
  Stage 3, UCI World Cup (Sprint), Manchester (GBR)
  Stage 3, UCI World Cup (Team sprint), Manchester (GBR)
  Stage 1, UCI World Cup (Keirin), Moscow (RUS)
2006
  Stage 3, UCI World Cup (Team sprint), Carson, California (USA)
2008
 13th Olympic Games (Team sprint with Maciej Bielecki and Kamil Kuczyński),  Beijing (CHN)
 17th Olympic Games (Sprint), Beijing (CHN)

References

External links
 
 
 
 
 NBC Olympics Profile

1982 births
2018 deaths
Deaths from leukemia
Polish male cyclists
Polish track cyclists
Cyclists at the 2004 Summer Olympics
Cyclists at the 2008 Summer Olympics
Olympic cyclists of Poland
People from Grudziądz
Sportspeople from Kuyavian-Pomeranian Voivodeship
Deaths from cancer in Poland